Watkins Slave Cemetery is located in Davidsonville, Maryland, in Anne Arundel County, on Maryland 424 (Davidsonville Road),  south of US 50/301.

In 1960, road construction revealed the remains of anonymous slaves. They were reburied at Mt. Tabor Church, 1421 St. Stephens Church Road, in Crownsville, Maryland. There is a historical marker, which says the slaves were associated with the Locust Grove Plantation.

References

Tourist attractions in Anne Arundel County, Maryland
Cemeteries in Maryland
African-American cemeteries
History of slavery in Maryland